Aalinganam is a 1976 Indian Malayalam-language film, directed by I. V. Sasi and written by Sherif. The film stars Raghavan, Sridevi, Rani Chandra and Vincent. The film has musical score by A. T. Ummer. Sasi remade it in Tamil as Pagalil Oru Iravu (1979), with Sridevi returning.

Plot

Cast 

Raghavan as Ramesh
Sridevi as Bindu
Rani Chandra as Dr. Raji
Vincent as Vinod
Paul Vengola
Prathapachandran
Bahadoor as Rajashekharan
K. P. Ummer as Dr. Gopinath
Kuthiravattam Pappu as Neelambaran
Leela Namboothiri
Meena as Sharadamma
Ragini as Vimala
Vanchiyoor Radha

Production 
Aalinganam was one of the earliest films where Sridevi played an adult, despite being 12 or 13 years old.

Soundtrack 
The music was composed by A. T. Ummer and the lyrics were written by Bichu Thirumala. The song "Thushaarabindukkale" was written by Bichu Thirumala for his play Dandakaranyam, and included in Aalinganam because Sasi liked it; though Kannur Rajan composed that song, he was not credited for it.

Accolades 
At the Kerala State Film Awards, Ummer won the award for Best Music Director, and Janaki won for Best Female Playback Singer.

References

External links 
 

1970s Malayalam-language films
1976 films
Films directed by I. V. Sasi
Malayalam films remade in other languages